Francis George "Franc" Roddam (born 29 April 1946) is an English film director, businessman, screenwriter, television producer and publisher, best known as the creator of Auf Wiedersehen, Pet and the director of Quadrophenia (1979). He is a graduate of the London Film School.

Career

Roddam's films include Quadrophenia, K2, Aria, The Lords of Discipline and War Party. He created the worldwide TV franchise, MasterChef, which is shown in 200 countries worldwide and there are 47 locally produced versions.

He also produced formats for Auf Wiedersehen, Pet, Making Out, and Harry, all of which were highly successful TV dramas. He directed the award-winning TV drama Dummy, which won the prestigious Prix Italia Drama Prize. He directed the Grammy-nominated/Golden Globe nominated US mini-series Moby Dick and Cleopatra.

He won awards for his BBC documentaries, Mini and The Family. He is the founder and Chairman of Ziji Publishing, whose many titles include The Last Templar which sold over 5 million copies worldwide. He is a sponsor and former Governor of the London Film School and is an active member of the Greenworld Campaign.

Filmography

Films
 Quadrophenia (1979) - Director/co-writer
 The Lords of Discipline (1983) - Director
 The Bride (1985) - Director
 Aria (1987) - Segment director
 War Party (1988) - Director
 K2 (1991) - Director

Television
 Birthday (1969) - Director
 The Fight (1973) - Executive Producer
 The Family (1974) - Co-director
 Mini (1975) - Director (episode of Inside Story documentary series)
 Dummy (1977) - Director/producer
 Auf Wiedersehen, Pet (1983-2004) - Format creator, executive producer, writer
 Johnny Oddball (1985) - Director (episode of 40 Minutes documentary series; sequel to Mini)
 Making Out (1989) - Format creator
 An Ungentlemanly Act (1992) - Executive producer
 Harry (1993-1995) - Format creator, executive producer
 The Crow Road (1996) - Executive producer
 Cleopatra (1999) - Director (2 x 90 mins)
 Moby Dick (1998) - Director (2 x 90 mins)
 The Canterbury Tales (2003) - Format creator, executive producer
 MasterChef (2007-2015) - Format creator, executive producer

Commercials
Director on numerous accounts, including:
 Shell
 The Observer
 Campbell Soups
 BP
 COI – Aids Campaign

In development
 Waltzing Matilda — Producer/director/co-writer
 Let's Face It — Producer/director/co-writer
 IGGY — Format creator/co-writer
 Win-Win — Format creator/co-producer
 2 in a Million — Format creator/producer

References

External links

Ziji Publishing - Official website

English film directors
1946 births
Living people
People from Norton, County Durham
English screenwriters
English male screenwriters
English television producers
English businesspeople
English publishers (people)
Mountaineering film directors
Alumni of the London Film School